Guilty Pleasure  is the third studio album by American crunkcore band brokeNCYDE, released on November 8, 2011 through Suburban Noize Records. This album features significantly less screaming than earlier efforts. It is the last album to feature Phat J before his departure from the group.

Reception
Guilty Pleasure was heavily panned worldwide.

Track listing

Guilty Pleasurez
Guilty Pleasurez is a re-release of Guilty Pleasure, released on March 13, 2012. The album includes the same track listing, plus one new song ("Never Back Down"), an updated version of "Magnum" (featuring Mickey Avalon) and a 'screamix' of "Doin' My Thang" (with Antz doing screams and featuring The Dirtball).

Track listing

Personnel
Brokencyde
 Se7en – lead vocals
 Mikl – clean vocals
 Phat J – keyboards, synthesizers, programming, death growl, rap vocals
 Antz – rhythm production, beats

References

1. http://puregrainaudio.com/news/brokencyde-returns-november-8th-with-new-album-guilty-pleasure 

Brokencyde albums
2011 albums
Suburban Noize Records albums